Borivoje Filipović (Serbian Cyrillic: Боривоје Филиповић; born 28 August 1982) is a Serbian professional footballer who plays as a striker.

Honours

Club
Novi Sad
 Serbian League Vojvodina: 2006–07
Inđija
 Serbian First League: 2009–10

Individual
 Serbian First League Top Scorer: 2009–10

External links
 
 
 

Association football forwards
Expatriate footballers in Bosnia and Herzegovina
Expatriate footballers in Kazakhstan
Expatriate footballers in Slovakia
FC Irtysh Pavlodar players
FC Spartak Trnava players
FK Inđija players
FK Kabel players
FK Leotar players
RFK Novi Sad 1921 players
FK Proleter Novi Sad players
FK Srbobran players
Kazakhstan Premier League players
Premier League of Bosnia and Herzegovina players
Serbia and Montenegro footballers
Serbian expatriate footballers
Serbian expatriate sportspeople in Bosnia and Herzegovina
Serbian expatriate sportspeople in Kazakhstan
Serbian expatriate sportspeople in Slovakia
Serbian First League players
Serbian footballers
Slovak Super Liga players
Footballers from Novi Sad
1982 births
Living people